Purkersdorf Sanatorium is a railway station serving Purkersdorf in Lower Austria.

References 

Railway stations in Lower Austria
Austrian Federal Railways